Jinete is Spanish for "horseman", especially in the context of light cavalry.

Etymology
The word Jinete (of Berber zenata) designates, in Castilian and the Provençal dialect of Occitan language, those who show great skill and riding especially if this relates to their work. In Portuguese, it is spelled ginete.
The term jennet for a small Spanish horse has the same source.

Medieval Hispanic light cavalry
As a military term, jinete (also spelled ginete or genitour) means a Spanish light horseman that wore leather armor and were armed with javelins, a spear, a sword, and a shield. They were a type of mounted troop developed in the early Middle Ages in response to the massed light cavalry of the Moors. Often fielded in significant numbers by the Spanish, and at times the most numerous of the Spanish mounted troops, they played an important role in Spanish mounted warfare throughout the Reconquista until the sixteenth century. They were to serve successfully in the Italian Wars under Gonzalo de Córdoba and Ramón de Cardona.

Sir Charles Oman describes their tactics thus:

In addition, Philippe Contamine records they used the tactic of feigned flight (tourna-fuye).
 
Jinetes existed in considerable numbers. During the period 1485-9, Castilian armies mustered between 11-13,000 jinetes. Some of these were provided by the Military Orders. The Master of Santiago provided 300, while the Master of Calatrava was responsible for a further 450. In May 1493, a number of standing companies were established in Castile called the guardas viejas (veteran guard). These included five captaincies of 100 jinetes. In 1496, the guardas reales (royal guard) of Castile included 130 jinetes. Out of 600 cavalry in the Spanish expeditionary force to Italy in 1495, 500 were jinetes.

Contemporary usage
In Mexico, jinete means "rodeo rider", hence "cowboy".

In Castilian, it is used adjectivally of a rider who knows how to ride a horse, especially those who are fluent or champions at equestrian practices, such as the gaucho, the huaso of the plains, the cowboy, Vaquero, or charro among others.
It is also used in the Spanish Army to designate personnel belonging to the cavalry arm.
 
In its original Spanish title "The Four Horsemen of the Apocalypse" by Vicente Blasco Ibáñez is "Los Cuatro Jinetes del Apocalipsis". Canción de jinete is a poem by Federico García Lorca.

The novel El jinete polaco by Antonio Muñoz Molina was published in 1991.

See also
 Jineterismo

References

External links

 Lanza Gineta: Spanish Light Cavalry of the Early Italian Wars

Equestrianism
Military units and formations of the Italian Wars
Military units and formations of the Middle Ages
Military units and formations of Spain